Aristotelia crypsixantha is a moth of the family Gelechiidae. It was described by Turner in 1919. It is found in Australia, where it has been recorded from New South Wales.

The wingspan is 12–13 mm. The forewings are grey with obscure ochreous streaks from the base beneath the costa to one-third, along the fold, and in the middle from one-third to the termen. There is a short blackish streak on the fold near the base and a blackish discal dot at one-third and sometimes another at two-thirds. Some blackish scales are found at the apex. The hindwings are grey.

References

Moths described in 1919
Aristotelia (moth)
Moths of Australia